Tomáš Kunc (born 22 February 1993, in Boskovice) is a Czech football player who currently plays for FC Zbrojovka Brno.

References

External links
 
 
 Profile at FC Zbrojovka Brno official site

1993 births
Living people
People from Boskovice
Czech footballers
Czech Republic youth international footballers
Czech Republic under-21 international footballers
Czech First League players
FC Zbrojovka Brno players
Association football midfielders
Sportspeople from the South Moravian Region